Conquer is the sixth studio album by American heavy metal band Soulfly. It saw official release on July 23, 2008, in Australia, although the album had leaked early onto file-sharing networks. It was released on July 29, 2008, in Canada and the United States and debuted at #66 on the U.S. Billboard 200 — Soulfly's highest Billboard peak since their 2002 release, 3.

Production and release
The album was tracked by Tim C. Lau in late 2007 at The Porch Recording Studio in Orlando, Florida and mixed by Andy Sneap in early 2008. In promotion for the album, Max Cavalera stated that he had been heavily influenced by Bolt Thrower, Napalm Death and Slayer in writing for this album, which he declared would make Dark Ages sound like a pop album.

A bonus edition of the album was released containing three bonus tracks and a DVD. The DVD features a full live concert from Warsaw, Poland and the music video for "Innerspirit" from the previous album, Dark Ages.

The album sold over 8,400 copies in the U.S. during the first week of its release.

Songs
"Unleash" was the album's first single with the accompanying music video directed by Robert Sexton. This song and its video features Dave Peters of Throwdown. The second single released was Blood Fire War Hate, the first track of the album, featuring Morbid Angel vocalist David Vincent. "Touching the Void" is heavily influenced by Black Sabbath as it contains doom and sludgy riffs, with outro recorded by French dub artist Fedaya Pacha. "Warmageddon" explores war and Armageddon, hence its portmanteau.

Critical reception

Conquer has thus far garnered positive reviews from most media outlets and review websites. Chad Bower of About.com calls it "outstanding", with "great musicianship and songwriting" and "new styles, sounds and experiments, which also hit the mark." Nikos Patelis of Metal Invader notes the "hardcore beatings, extreme thrash speeds and many implements of weird sounds that have nothing to do with metal" and deems the album "dark as hell". In comparison to Cavalera Conspiracy's debut earlier this year, Dominic Hemy of Planet Loud considers Conquer "tighter, heavier, more diverse, more original, and far more engaging than Inflikted".

Track listing

Bonus DVD listing
Live in Warsaw, Poland
"Prophecy"
"Downstroy"
"Seek 'n' Strike"
"No Hope = No Fear"
"Jumpdafuckup/Bring It"
"Living Sacrifice"
"Mars"
"Brasil"
"No"
"L.O.T.M."
"Porrada"
"Drums"
"Moses"
"Frontlines"
"Back to the Primitive"
"Eye for an Eye"

Music Video
"Innerspirit"

Personnel 

Soulfly
 Max Cavalera – vocals, 4-string guitar, berimbau, sitar
 Marc Rizzo – lead guitar, flamenco guitar
 Bobby Burns – bass
 Joe Nunez – drums, percussion
Additional musicians
 David Vincent – additional vocals on "Blood Fire War Hate"
 Dave Peters – additional vocals on "Unleash"
 Fedayi Pacha – duduk, percussion on "Touching the Void", dub outro on "For Those About to Rot"
 Jean-Pol Dub - didgeridoo on "Touching the Void"
 Tim Lau - drum programming

Production
 Max Cavalera - production
 Tim Laud productions - engineering, recording
 Tim Lau - digital editing
 Andy Sneap - mixing
 Ted Jensen - mastering
 Monte Conner - A&R
 Logan Mader - mixing on "The Beautiful People"
Management
 Gloria Cavalera - management
 Christina Stajanovic - assistant
 Bryan Roberts - assistant
Artwork
Android Jones - artwork
Max Cavalera - art direction
Charles Dooher - art direction
 Mr. Scott Design inc. - design
 Eddie Malluk - band photography
 Leo Zuletta - Soulfly logo

Chart positions

References

2008 albums
Soulfly albums
Albums produced by Max Cavalera
Roadrunner Records albums